W. A. Shinn was an American politician in the state of Washington. He served in the Washington House of Representatives from 1889 to 1891.

References

Members of the Washington House of Representatives
Year of birth missing
Year of death missing